Piteå IF is a Swedish football club located in Piteå.

Background

The club was formed 24 May 1918 but did not take up football until 1920 when they merged with their local rivaling club IFK Piteå, which then was dissolved. Piteå IF is currently playing in the third-highest Swedish division, Division 2, for men and the ladies' team are playing in the highest league, Damallsvenskan, which is their highest-ever position in the Swedish ladies' league system. The men's team's best season up until this day is their season in Sweden's second-highest division 1998. The club's men's reserve team play in the sixth highest Swedish league, Division 4.

The club has one of the largest youth academies in football in the county of Norrbotten and is one of two arranging clubs of the large international youth football cup Piteå Summer Games.

The club plays their home matches at LF Arena.

Season to season

Attendances

In recent seasons Piteå IF have had the following average attendances:

Current squad
.

External links
 Piteå IF – official site
 Piteå Summer Games – official site

Footnotes

IF
Football clubs in Norrbotten County
Association football clubs established in 1918
Piteå IF